Eslamabad-e Chehel Cheshmeh (also Romanized as Eslāmābād-e Chehel Cheshmeh) is a village in Qarah Chaman Rural District, Arzhan District, Shiraz County, Fars Province, Iran. At the 2006 census, its population was 127, in 21 families.

References 

Populated places in Shiraz County